Gino Antonio (born Jack Badon) is a former Filipino actor.

Life and career
Antonio came from a family of farmers. He started as a lifeguard before becoming a model and actor. He was identified with bold movies together with Vida Verde, Joy Sumilang, Cristina Crisol, Mark Joseph, Greggy Liwag, Tony Martínez and the late George Estregan.

In 1984, Antonio did his first movie Private Show, which was about the lives of 'toro'/'torera' (live sex performers), with Jacklyn Jose and Leopoldo Salcedo. He was nominated for the Gawad Urian Best Actor award in 1987 for the movie Takaw Tukso. His other notable films includes' Sabik... Kasalanan Ba? (1986), Ginto Sa Putikan (1987), and Virginia P. (1989) starring Alma Moreno, Joey Marquez, Richard Gomez and Alice Dixson.

He was included in the movie Ang Babaeng Nawawala Sa Sarili (1989). In 1990, he did Chito Rono's film' Kasalanan Bang Sambahin Ka? with Vivian Velez, Chanda Romero, Dawn Zulueta and Julio Diaz.

After several years of doing films, Gino Antonio decided to leave the entertainment industry. The former daring actor is now living in Dumaguete. There he tried another field of career.

Gino ventured into agricultural business. He tried to grow rice, fruits, and vegetables. Eventually, After his acting stint, he went to Dumaguete to farm before concentrated on the cultivation of tilapia. He is now President of the Tilapia Association in Dumaguete.
 https://newspapers.ph/2020/03/gino-antonio-remember-this-former-daring-actor-heres-his-life-now/

Filmography
2004 Liberated 2
2004 Naglalayag
2002 Kapalaran (TV series)
2000 Waray
2000 Perlas Sa Ilalim Ng Dagat
2000 Huwag
1998 Divino: Anak Ni Totoy Mola
1998 Kung Liligaya Ka Sa Piling Ng Iba
1997 Utang Ko Sa Iyo Ang Buhay Ko
1997 Mapanuksong Hiyas
1997 Haplos Ng Pagmamahal
1996 Madaling Mamatay, Mahirap Mabuhay
1993 Sgt. Alvarez: Ex-Marine
1993 Hulihin: Probinsiyanong Mandurukot
1991 Una Kang Naging Akin
1990 Tayo Na Sa Dilim
1990 Kasalanan Bang Sambahin Ka?
1990 Kahit Isumpa Mo Ako
1990 Nimfa
1990 Anak Ni Baby Ama
1989 Ang Babaeng Nawawala Sa Sarili
1989 Virginia P.
1989 Kailan Mahuhugasan Ang Kasalanan?
1988 Damong Makamandag
1987 Pakawala
1987 Ibigin Mo Ako Nang Higit Sa Lahat
1987 Ang Nusog At 3 Itlog
1987 Ginto Sa Putikan
1987 Amanda
1986 Dalagita
1986 Haplos Ng Pagmamahal
1986 Raid Casa
1986 Bawal: Malaswa
1986 Kapirasong Dangal
1986 Di Maghilom Ang Sugat
1986 Hapdi
1986 Sabik... Kasalanan Ba?
1984 Mahilig
1984 Nalalasap Ang Hapdi

1986 Takaw Tukso
1985 Private Show
1984 Mahilig
1984 Nalalasap Ang Hapdi

References

External links

Living people
Year of birth missing (living people)
Place of birth missing (living people)
Male actors from Negros Oriental